Born Yesterday is a 1950 American comedy-drama film directed by George Cukor, based on the 1946 stage play of the same name by Garson Kanin. The screenplay was credited to Albert Mannheimer. According to Kanin's autobiography, Cukor did not like Mannheimer's work, believing it lacked much of the play's value, so he approached Kanin about adapting a screenplay from his own play. Because of legal entanglements, Kanin did not receive screen credit.

The film tells the story of an uneducated young woman, Billie Dawn (played by Judy Holliday, in an Oscar-winning performance) and an uncouth, older, wealthy junkyard tycoon, Harry Brock (Broderick Crawford) who comes to Washington to try to "buy" a congressman. When Billie embarrasses him socially, Harry hires journalist Paul Verrall (William Holden) to educate her. In the process, Billie learns how corrupt Harry is, and eventually falls in love with Paul.

The film was produced and released by Columbia Pictures. Kanin frequently stated that Harry Brock was modeled on Columbia production chief Harry Cohn, with whom Kanin had a long and testy relationship. According to Cohn biographer Bob Thomas, Cohn knew of Kanin's attribution but didn't care about it.

In 2012, Born Yesterday was deemed "culturally, historically, or aesthetically significant" by the United States Library of Congress and selected for preservation in the National Film Registry.

Plot

Bullying, uncouth junkyard tycoon Harry Brock goes to Washington, D.C., with his brassy girlfriend, Emma "Billie" Dawn, and his crooked lawyer, Jim Devery, to "influence" a politician or two. As a legal precaution, Devery presses Harry to marry Billie, as a wife cannot be forced to testify against her husband.

Harry becomes disgusted with Billie's ignorance and lack of manners, though his are much worse. He hires journalist Paul Verrall, who had come to interview him, to educate her and give her some culture. Blossoming under Paul's encouragement and her own hard work, Billie learns about literature, history, politics and the law, and turns out to be much smarter than anyone knew.

Billie starts thinking for herself and applying her learning to her situation. She also falls in love with Paul, who respects and appreciates her. When she stands up to Harry, he reacts violently, striking her and forcing her to sign the contracts related to his crooked deal.

Meanwhile, Devery has persuaded Harry to sign over many of his assets to Billie to hide them from the government. When Harry experiences Billie's new independence, he tries to intimidate her into signing his assets back to him. Billie and Paul use her leverage to escape from Harry's domination. She promises to give him back his property little by little as long as he leaves them alone. A brief final scene reveals that Billie and Paul have married.

Cast

Pre-production
Though all the major Hollywood studios wanted to film Garson Kanin's Broadway play Born Yesterday, Columbia Studios purchased the rights for $1 million in 1948. However, the project was put on the shelf for months because of casting problems. In April 1950, Columbia head Harry Cohn assigned George Cukor to direct the film, though Cukor was not the studio's first choice.

Cukor's preparatory work for Born Yesterday was quite innovative. The actors rehearsed the screenplay for two weeks, then performed it before an audience drawn from studio employees. Cukor's idea was to give the actors a chance to develop “dimensional characters,” and clock laugh values from audience reaction before the cameras began rolling.  Cukor held that if a scene is funny, there is no need to play about with it. When people complained, “that laugh overrode the line, I did not hear the next line,” Cukor's answer remained the same, “Go and see the movie again.” But he did make some changes – when the laughter was long and loud, he added some visual detail.

Casting
According to a Hollywood Reporter news item, Holliday initially refused to reprise her popular Broadway role for the film. In September 1947, Rita Hayworth was reported to be in line for the role, but in late April 1949, it was reported that Gloria Grahame was to be borrowed from RKO for the lead, and that Jean Arthur and Lana Turner had also been considered for the part. An October 16, 1947 Hollywood Reporter news item stated that Columbia was negotiating with Paul Douglas to reprise his Broadway role.

According to modern sources, Kanin convinced Cohn to cast Holliday by  co-writing – with wife Ruth Gordon – a part specifically for her in the 1949 MGM film Adam's Rib. Holliday's performance in the film garnered her critical acclaim and convinced Cohn of her comedic abilities. Larry Oliver and Frank Otto also reprised their Broadway roles. A September 20, 1950 article in the Los Angeles Daily News reported that before filming began, the cast perfected their comic timing during six performances in front of live audiences of studio employees.

Censorship
Although the film was clearly written for a mature audience, Kanin and Cukor were forced to amend the film to appease censors. Cukor explained, "It seems ludicrous now, but twenty years ago you couldn't have a character say, 'I love that broad,' you couldn't even say 'broad.' And the nonsense that went on to get over the fact that Judy Holliday and Broderick Crawford lived together! It required the greatest skill and some new business that Garson invented, like Billie Dawn always creeping into the apartment the back way. We managed to keep it amusing, I think, but it was so unnecessary."

However, the censors thought the scrutiny was necessary, and Cukor was urged to use caution when filming Holliday's dresses. At that time, it was mandatory for intimate body areas, especially breasts, to be completely covered. The censors also requested that Cukor avoid any suggestion that Billie was trying to get Paul in bed. Billie's line "Are you one of those talkers, or would you be interested in a little action?" was deemed offensive. However, Cukor stood his ground, and the line made it into the final cut.

Costumes
In the stage production, Holliday's character Billie Dawn wore only five costumes, but in the film, costume designer Jean Louis designed thirteen elaborate creations. Cukor asked Louis to “characterize” the clothes, with obviously expensive and ornate clothes at the beginning, when Billie is dumb and self-centered. However, as she acquires culture, her wardrobe becomes simpler and more elegant.

Locations
To increase the film's authenticity, Cukor went to Washington, D.C. for locations, and the city  became a dramatic personage in the story. Six named Washington, D.C. locations (Jefferson Memorial, Library of Congress, National Gallery of Art, Statler Hotel, United States Capitol and the Watergate Steps, where Dawn and Verrall attend a then-regular outdoor summer concert of the National Symphony Orchestra) were included in the shoot. Observing tourists at the Lincoln Memorial, Cukor noticed that sightseers would chew gum and give works of art a cursory glance, if any at all. But in Hollywood movies, sightseers invariably were shown standing in rapt attention. Avoiding these cliches, Cukor considered the outdoor scenes among his best efforts.

Premiere
The Hollywood premiere of Born Yesterday was attended by many celebrities and the film was met with enthusiastic applause. Jan Sterling and Paul Douglas, who had played the two leading roles on stage, attended the premiere.

Reviews
In a review published the day after the film's premiere, Bosley Crowther of The New York Times wrote, "Just in time to make itself evident as one of the best pictures of this fading year is Columbia's trenchant screen version of the stage play, 'Born Yesterday' ... On the strength of this one appearance, there is no doubt that Miss Holliday will leap into popularity as a leading American movie star." Variety stated, "Columbia has a promising box-office offering in its screen version of the Broadway hit play, 'Born Yesterday.' The bright, biting comedy of the Garson Kanin legit piece adapts easily to film and there is every indication that key-city audiences will give it a hearty ticket play." Richard L. Coe of The Washington Post called it "an even more beguiling comedy than it was on the stage, and Judy Holliday's even funnier ... It's one of the few I'd like to see twice." A review in Harrison's Reports declared, "An excellent adult comedy ... What really puts the picture over is the brilliant performance of Judy Holliday as the beautiful but dizzy 'girl-friend' of an unscrupulous, uncouth multi-millionaire junk dealer, whose downfall is brought about when he makes the mistake of deciding that she needs an education. One has to see and hear Miss Holliday to fully appreciate the superb delivery of her lines and the fine shadings of her artful mannerisms." The Monthly Film Bulletin stated, "Garson Kanin's comedy is a pleasing lesson in the virtues of democracy, enlivened by smart, sometimes witty, dialogue and by characterisation which, if broad and simple, is always lively."

Syndicated Catholic columnist William H. Mooring decried the film as "clever film satire strictly from [Karl] Marx." In 1951, the film was picketed by the Anti-Communist Committee of the Catholic War Veterans because Holliday and Kanin were affiliated with organizations on the U.S attorney general's list of subversive groups.

Supporters of the film included columnist Louella Parsons, reviewer William R. Weaver of the Motion Picture Herald and Kenneth Clark of the MPAA, who stated "we feel very deeply and sincerely the picture gives warmth and positive support to the democratic ideals, principles and institutions of America."

Awards and nominations
In late 1950 many critics predicted that the Academy Award for Best Actress would be given to Gloria Swanson for Sunset Boulevard or Bette Davis for All About Eve and were surprised that the recipient was newcomer Judy Holliday for this film. Bette Davis believed that her and Swanson's comparable characters effectively "cancelled each other out", allowing Holliday to win, a theory also invoked to explain Marisa Tomei's dark horse Best Supporting Actress win over Miranda Richardson and Vanessa Redgrave for the 1993 Joe Pesci vehicle, My Cousin Vinny. Swanson recalled the press's reaction following Holliday's win: "It slowly dawned on me that they were asking for a larger-than-life scene, or better still, a mad scene. More accurately, they were trying to flush out Norma Desmond."

The British film magazine Picturegoer awarded the film its Seal of Merit, but warned its readers that Holliday's character is "from New York's East Side, and speaks in a baby Bronx voice that is like the tinkling of many tiny, tuneless cymbals." The magazine admired Holliday's performance and spoke of her in the same breath as Carole Lombard.

The film is recognized by American Film Institute in these lists:
 2000: AFI's 100 Years... 100 Laughs – #24
 2005: AFI's 100 Years...100 Movie Quotes:
 Billie Dawn: "Wouldja do me a favor, Harry? Drop dead!" – Nominated
 2008: AFI's 10 Top 10:
 Nominated Romantic Comedy Film

Remake
Throughout the 1970s and 1980s, Kanin reportedly pursued plans for an updated remake, possibly starring Bette Midler, Barbra Streisand or Whoopi Goldberg, as well as a musical version that might star Bernadette Peters or Dolly Parton, with Frank Sinatra as Harry Brock, but neither of these projects came to fruition. The remake was finally made in 1993, directed by Luis Mandoki and starring Melanie Griffith, Don Johnson and John Goodman.

In popular culture
In the "Stage 5" episode of The Sopranos, J.T. (Tim Daly) cites this film as the inspiration for the mob boss character in the film Cleaver.
Jimmy McGill and Kim Wexler watch a scene from Born Yesterday during the final scene of "Plan and Execution", the mid-season finale of Better Call Saul season 6. The film is also partially shown in the mid-season premiere "Point and Shoot".

References

External links 
Born Yesterday essay by Ariel Schudson on the National Film Registry site

 
 
 
 
   Ann Hornaday, "The 34 best political movies ever made" The Washington Post Jan. 23, 2020, ranked No. 9

1950 films
1950s romantic comedy-drama films
1950s satirical films
American romantic comedy-drama films
American satirical films
American black-and-white films
Columbia Pictures films
American films based on plays
Films directed by George Cukor
Films featuring a Best Actress Academy Award-winning performance
Films featuring a Best Musical or Comedy Actress Golden Globe winning performance
Films scored by Friedrich Hollaender
Films set in Washington, D.C.
United States National Film Registry films
1950 comedy films
1950 drama films
1950s English-language films
1950s American films